The Arra Mountains or Arra Hills (Irish: Sliabh an Ara) are situated in County Tipperary in Ireland, between the towns of Nenagh and Ballina, south east of Lough Derg (Shannon) and north of the M7 Motorway.

The highest summit is Tountinna (Irish: Tonn Toinne) at 457m high.

On Loughtea Hill, south-west of Portroe, a  stainless steel cross was erected in 2002 to mark the millennium and to replace an original cross placed there following the Eucharistic Congress of Dublin (1932).

Fintan's Grave a cave on Tountinna where in mythology Fintan mac Bóchra is said to have waited out the flood here.

Description

In addition, some definitions also include a topographical prominence requirement, typically . In practice, mountains in Scotland are frequently referred to as "hills" no matter what their height, as reflected in names such as the Cuillin Hills and the Torridon Hills. In Wales, the distinction is more a term of land use and appearance and has nothing to do with height. For a while, the US defined a mountain as being  or more tall. Any similar landform lower than this height was considered a hill. However, today, the United States Geological Survey (USGS) concludes that these terms do not have technical definitions in the US. However both the Placenames Database of Ireland and the Ordnance Survey of Ireland refer to the Arra range as mountains, not hills.

There are a few loop walks on and around Tountinna going through Killary Glen and past Black Lough. The Lough Derg Way passes through Laghtea Hill and Tountinna.

There is a small valley called Killary Glen southwest of Tountinna

List of Hills 
 Tountinna, Tonn Toinne 457m
 Loughtea, Cnoc Leacht Aodha  320m
 Corbally Hill, Cnoc an Chorrbhaile 339m
 Coum Hill, Cnoc an Choim 330m

References

Mountains and hills of County Tipperary